Priesthood Restoration (also known as Restoration of the Aaronic Priesthood: John the Baptist, or simply John the Baptist) is a 1957 bronze sculpture by Avard Fairbanks, installed in Salt Lake City’s Temple Square, in the U.S. state of Utah.

Description
The statue measures approximately 10 x 8 x 4 feet and rests on a stone base which measures approximately 7 x 10 x 6 feet. It depicts John the Baptist wearing robes, with Oliver Cowdery and Joseph Smith kneeling at his side. A nearby plaque reads:

History
The artwork is administered by the Church of Jesus Christ of the Latter-day Saints’ Museum of Church History and Art.  It was surveyed by the Smithsonian Institution’s “Save Outdoor Sculpture” program in 1993.

References

Bronze sculptures in Utah
Outdoor sculptures in Salt Lake City
Sculptures of men in Utah
Statues in Utah